Monte Civetta (3,220 m) is a prominent and major mountain of the Dolomites, in the Province of Belluno in northern Italy. Its north-west face can be viewed from the Taibon Agordino valley, and is classed as one of the symbols of the Dolomites.

The mountain is thought to have been first climbed by Simeone di Silvestro in 1855, which, if true, makes it the first major Dolomite peak to be climbed. The north-western face, with its 1,000-metre-high cliff, was first climbed in 1925 by Emil Solleder and  Gustl Lettenbauer. It is historically considered the first "sixth grade" in six-tier scale of alpinistic difficulties proposed by Willo Welzenbach (corresponding to 5.9). Thirty years later UIAA used this as a basis for its grading system.

The famed Svan mountain climber Mikhail Khergiani died in a climbing accident on Monte Civetta in 1969.

References

External links
Monte Civetta on Hike.uno
Monte Civetta on Summitpost.org

Mountains of Veneto
Dolomites
Mountains of the Alps
Alpine three-thousanders